A beth midrash ( "House of Learning"; pl. batei midrash), also beis medrash or beit midrash, is a hall dedicated for Torah study, often translated as a "study hall." It is distinct from a synagogue (beth knesset), although the two are often coextensive. In Yiddish the beth midrash may be referred to as a zal, i.e. "hall". Beis midrash can also refer to a yeshiva gedola, the undergraduate-level program in Orthodox, for boys over 12th grade.

The Arabic term madrasah is derived from the same Semitic root, and refers to any type of educational institution. The root דרש means "to seek [knowledge]"  and is then generalized to mean "expound".

History
Early rabbinic literature, including the Mishnah, makes mention of the beth midrash as an institution distinct from the beth din and Sanhedrin. It was meant as a place of Torah study and interpretation, as well as the development of halakha (the practical application of the Jewish Law).

The origin of the beth midrash, or house of study, can be traced to the early rabbinic period, following the Siege of Jerusalem (70 CE) in which the destruction of the Temple took place. The earliest known rabbinical school was established by Rabbi Yochanan ben Zakkai at Yavne. Other official schools were soon established under different rabbis. These men traced their ideological roots back to the rabbis of the late Second Temple period, specifically the Houses of Hillel and Shammai, two schools of thought.

By late antiquity, the beth midrash had developed along with the synagogue into a distinct though somewhat related institution. The main difference between the beth midrash and beth hakeneset (synagogue) is that the beth hakeneset is sanctified for prayer only and that even the study of Torah would violate its sanctity while in the beth midrash both Torah study and prayer are allowed. For this reason most synagogues designate their sanctuary as a beth midrash so that in addition to prayer the study of the Torah would also be permitted.

Structure
There are generally either benches or chairs for sitting, along with tables on which books are placed. In Lithuanian yeshivas the beth midrash will have shtenders (standing desks resembling lecterns; the Yiddish word is derived from the German Ständer).

A characteristic beth midrash has many hundreds of books, including at least several copies of the entire Talmud, Torah, siddurim (prayer books), Shulchan Aruch, Mishneh Torah, Arba'ah Turim and other frequently consulted works.

In modern times, batei midrash are typically found as the central study halls of yeshivas or independent kollels, both institutions of Torah study. The location and institution of study are often interchanged, so in popular parlance, yeshivot are sometimes referred to as batei midrash. A beth midrash may also be housed in a synagogue, or vice versa. In antiquity, this is a matter of debate (see below). Many batei midrash originally serve the community but attract a yeshiva in the course of their existence.

Virtual 
A virtual  is an online forum that provides articles for self-study and live, online classes. However, it generally does not provide for the chavrusa-style learning typical of a beth midrash study hall.

See also
 Mechina
 Midrasha - a women's institution for Torah study

References

External links
 The virtual Beit Midrash at Yeshiva.co

For more information, see George Foot Moore's Judaism, as well as the more recent works of Jacob Neusner. Also, Lee I. Levine's The Rabbinic Class of Roman Palestine in Late Antiquity, as well as the relevant articles in Dan Urman and Paul V. M. Flesher's edited volume, Ancient Synagogues: Historical Analysis and Archaeological Discovery.

Orthodox Judaism
Orthodox yeshivas
Hebrew words and phrases